Wright Gemini, a generic name for a style of low-floor double-deck bus bodywork built by Wright may refer to:

 Wright Eclipse Gemini, on Volvo chassis (B7TL, B9TL or B5L)
 Wright Gemini 2 DL, an integral double-decker with VDL chassis modules
 Wright Gemini 2 HEV, an integral hybrid double-decker
 Wright Pulsar Gemini, on VDL DB250 chassis